SCSI Multimedia Commands (MMC) defines a SCSI/ATAPI based command set for accessing and controlling devices of type 05h. Such devices read or write optical media: CD, DVD, BD. T10 subcommittee is responsible for developing MMC as well as other SCSI command set standards. It was approved in December 1997 by ANSI.

See also
Mount Rainier (MRW)
Layer Jump Recording (LJR)
Optical disc recording modes
Small Form Factor committee (SFF)

References

SCSI